Charles Hedley Strutt (18 April 1849 – 19 December 1926) was a British Conservative Party politician.

He was the son of John James Strutt, the 2nd Baron Rayleigh, and his wife Clara née Vicars. He was educated at Winchester College and at Trinity College, Cambridge, where he graduated in 1871 with 1st class honours in moral science. He became a farmer in Essex, where he was a justice of the peace, and an alderman of Essex County Council.

He was the Member of Parliament for Eastern Essex from 1883 to 1885, when the constituency was divided. At the 1885 general election he unsuccessfully contested the Saffron Walden division of Essex.

After a decade's absence, he returned to the House of Commons as MP for Maldon in Essex from 1895 to 1906.

When not involved in politics he had interests in rubber production and was chairman of the Anglo-Dutch Plantations of Java.

References

External links 
 

1849 births
1926 deaths
People educated at Winchester College
Alumni of Trinity College, Cambridge
Councillors in Essex
Younger sons of barons
Conservative Party (UK) MPs for English constituencies
UK MPs 1880–1885
UK MPs 1895–1900
UK MPs 1900–1906
People from Terling
Charles Hedley Strutt
Members of Parliament for Maldon